Duke of Burgundy was a title used by the rulers of the Duchy of Burgundy, from its establishment in 843 to its annexation by France in 1477, and later by Holy Roman Emperors and Kings of Spain from the House of Habsburg who claimed Burgundy proper and ruled the Burgundian inheritance in the Low Countries.

The Duchy of Burgundy was a small portion of the traditional lands of the Burgundians west of the river Saône which, in 843, was allotted to Charles the Bald's kingdom of West Franks. Under the Ancien Régime, the Duke of Burgundy was the premier lay peer of the kingdom of France. Beginning with Robert II of France, the title was held by the Capetians, the French royal family. It was granted to Robert's younger son, Robert, who founded the House of Burgundy. When the senior line of the House of Burgundy became extinct, it was inherited by John II of France through proximity of blood. John granted the duchy to his younger son, Philip the Bold. The Valois Dukes of Burgundy gradually ruled over a vast complex of territories known as the Burgundian State, and became dangerous rivals to the senior line of the House of Valois.

When the male line of the Valois Dukes of Burgundy became extinct in 1477, the Duchy of Burgundy was confiscated by Louis XI of France. The title Duke of Burgundy passed to Habsburg monarchs via marriage. The Habsburgs used it to have a claim on Burgundy proper and to rule their Burgundian Inheritance. Today, the title is used by the House of Bourbon as a revived courtesy title.

List of Dukes of Burgundy

Bosonid dynasty (880–956)

The first margrave (marchio), later duke (dux), of Burgundy was Richard of the House of Ardennes, whose duchy was created from the merging of several regional counties of the kingdom of Provence which had belonged to his brother Boso.

His descendants and their relatives by marriage ruled the duchy until its annexation over a century later by the French crown, their suzerain.

Richard the Justiciar (880–921)
Rudolph (921–923), then King of the Franks
Hugh the Black (923–952)
Gilbert (952–956)

Robertian dynasty (956–1002)

Otto (956–965)
Eudes Henry the Great (965–1002)

House of Ivrea (1002–1004)

Otto William (1002–1004)

House of Capet (1004–1032)

In 1004, Burgundy was annexed by the king, of the House of Capet. Otto William continued to rule what would come to be called the Free County of Burgundy.  His descendants formed another House of Ivrea.

Robert (1004–1016) (also king of the Franks as Robert II)
Henry (1016–1032) (also king of the Franks as Henry I)

House of Burgundy (1032–1361)

Robert, son of Robert II of France, received the Duchy as a peace settlement, having disputed the succession to the throne of France with his brother Henry.

House of Valois-Burgundy (1363–1482)

John II of France, the second Valois king, successfully claimed the duchy after the death of Philip, the last Capet duke. John then passed the duchy to his youngest son Philip as an apanage.

Family tree

House of Habsburg (1482–1700)

In 1477, the territory of the Duchy of Burgundy was annexed by France. In the same year, Mary married Maximilian, Archduke of Austria, giving the Habsburgs control of the remainder of the Burgundian Inheritance.

Although the territory of the Duchy of Burgundy itself remained in the hands of France, the Habsburgs remained in control of the title of Duke of Burgundy and the other parts of the Burgundian inheritance, notably the Low Countries and the Free County of Burgundy in the Holy Roman Empire. They often used the term Burgundy to refer to it (e.g. in the name of the Imperial Circle it was grouped into), until the late 18th century, when the Austrian Netherlands were lost to the French Republic. The Habsburgs also continued to claim Burgundy proper until the Treaty of Cambrai in 1529, when they surrendered their claim in exchange for French recognition of Imperial sovereignty over Flanders and Artois.

Maximilian I (1477–1482 with his wife; regent 1482–1494)
Philip IV the Handsome, titular Duke of Burgundy as Philip IV (1482–1506)
Charles II (Holy Roman Emperor Charles V and King Charles I of Spain) 1506–1555

Philip V (King Philip II of Spain) 1556–1598
Isabella I (infanta Isabella Clara of Spain) and Albert I (Albert VII of Austria) (jure uxoris) 1598–1621
Philip VI (King Philip IV of Spain) 1621–1665
Charles III (King Charles II of Spain) 1665–1700

House of Bourbon, claimants of the title (1682–1761)

Louis, Duke of Burgundy (1682–1712)
Louis, Duke of Burgundy (1751-1761)

House of Habsburg (1713–1918)
Charles IV (Emperor Charles VI) 1713–1740
Maria Theresa 1740–1780
Francis I (Emperor Francis I) (1740–1765 with his wife)
Joseph (Emperor Joseph II) 1780–1790
Leopold (Emperor Leopold II) 1790–1792
Francis II (Emperor Francis II) 1792–1795/1835
Ferdinand (Emperor Ferdinand I) (1835–1848 titular only)
Franz Joseph (Emperor Franz Joseph I) (1848–1916 titular only)
Charles V (Emperor Charles I) (1916–1918 titular only later renounced)

House of Bourbon, revived title (1975–present)

King Juan Carlos I of Spain (1975–2014)
King Felipe VI of Spain (2014–present) – the title is one of the titles of the Spanish Crown
Louis, Dauphin of France (2010–present) – the title is used by eldest son of the Legitimist claimant to the French throne, Prince Louis, Duke of Anjou ("Louis XX").

See also
 Duchess of Burgundy
 Burgundian State
 Kingdom of Burgundy
 King of Burgundy
 Duchy of Burgundy
 County of Burgundy
 Count of Burgundy
Kingdom of Burgundy-Arles

References

Further reading
Calmette, Joseph. Doreen Weightman, trans. The Golden Age of Burgundy; the Magnificent Dukes and Their Courts. New York: W.W. Norton, 1962.
Chaumé, Maurice. Les Origines du Duché de Bourgogne. 2v. in 4 parts. Dijon: Jobard, 1925 (Darmstadt: npub, 1977).
Michael, Nicholas. Armies of Medieval Burgundy 1364–1477. London: Osprey, 1983. .
Vaughan, Richard.  Valois Burgundy.  London: Allen Lane, 1975. .

 
Burgundy